Saint Boniface is an unincorporated community in Cambria County, Pennsylvania, United States. Saint Boniface has a post office, with ZIP code 16675.

References

Unincorporated communities in Cambria County, Pennsylvania
Unincorporated communities in Pennsylvania